Wesley Ellis, Jr. (January 27, 1932 – June 4, 1984) was an American professional golfer who played on the PGA Tour in the 1950s, 1960s and 1970s.

Ellis was born in Kansas City, Missouri. He attended the University of Texas in Austin and was a member of the golf team from 1950–1952. He won the Massingill Trophy in 1950, and was the individual medalist at the Southwest Conference Championship in 1952. He graduated in 1953 with a degree in zoology and turned professional in 1954.

Ellis won three PGA Tour events. His first win came at the 1958 Canadian Open. He won by one stroke over Jay Hebert at the Mayfair Golf and Country Club in Edmonton, Alberta. His last win came in 1965 at the San Diego Open Invitational in a playoff against golf legend Billy Casper. His victory in San Diego was unique in that Ellis used what is commonly known as a "cross-handed" putting grip; that is, as a right-handed golfer he kept his left hand below his right.  Ellis had four top-10 finishes in major championships: a T-9 at the 1956 U.S. Open, a T-8 at the 1966 U.S. Open, a 6th at the 1960 PGA Championship and a T-5 at the 1961 PGA Championship.

Ellis, like many pro golfers of his generation, earned his living primarily as a club pro. For many years he was the head pro at the Westchester Country Club in Rye, New York and lived in Upper Saddle River, New Jersey. He died of kidney disease at the age of 52 at Holy Name Medical Center in Teaneck, New Jersey. He left behind his wife, Marian, and their four children - three daughters and a son.

Professional wins (15)

PGA Tour wins (3)

PGA Tour playoff record (1–1)

Other wins (12)
1957 Metropolitan Open
1961 New Jersey PGA Championship, Metropolitan Open
1962 New Jersey State Open, New Jersey PGA Championship
1963 New Jersey State Open, New Jersey PGA Championship, Metropolitan Open
1964 New Jersey PGA Championship
1968 Maracaibo Open Invitational, Westchester PGA Championship
1969 Westchester PGA Championship

Results in major championships

Note: Ellis never played in The Open Championship.

WD = withdrew
CUT = missed the half-way cut
"T" indicates a tie for a place

Summary

Most consecutive cuts made – 8 (1965 Masters – 1967 PGA)
Longest streak of top-10s – 1 (four times)

References

American male golfers
Texas Longhorns men's golfers
PGA Tour golfers
Golfers from Missouri
Sportspeople from Kansas City, Missouri
People from Upper Saddle River, New Jersey
Deaths from kidney disease
1932 births
1984 deaths